The Finals, formerly known as World Group, was the highest level of Davis Cup competition in 2021. It was held on indoor hard courts at three venues in Innsbruck, Austria, Madrid, Spain and Turin, Italy. The 2020 edition was originally scheduled to take place from 23 until 29 November 2020. However, on 26 June 2020, ITF announced that 2020 Finals would take place from 22 until 28 November 2021 due to coronavirus pandemic and be named 2021 Davis Cup Finals. On 18 January 2021, ITF announced that the Finals would be expanded over 11 days, from 25 November to 5 December 2021. The ties were contested in a best-of-three rubbers format and played on one day. There were two singles followed by a doubles. Spain were the defending champions, but were eliminated in the round robin stage. The Russian Tennis Federation won the title, defeating Croatia in the final. Andrey Rublev was named the Most Valuable Player of the tournament after going 6–1 in both singles and doubles.

Participating teams
18 nations take part in the Finals. The qualification was as follows:
 4 semifinalists of the previous edition
 2 wild card teams (announced by ITF on 23 November 2019 as France and Serbia)
 12 winners of the Qualifying Round, in March 2020

Overview
H = Host Nation, TH = Title-Holder, 2019F = Finalist from the 2019 tournament, 2019SF = Semi-Finalists from the 2019 tournament, WC = Wild Card

Seeds
The seedings were based on the Davis Cup Ranking of 9 March. Spain, as 2019 champions, are seeded No. 1  and were drawn into Pool A. Canada, as 2019 runners-up, are seeded No. 2 and were drawn into Pool B. The four other highest-ranked nations (France, Croatia, USA and Serbia) are seeded 3–6. The nations in pot 2 were drawn randomly into position 2 and the nations in pot 3 were drawn randomly into position 3.

  (Round robin)
  (Round robin)
  (Round robin)
  (Final)
  (Round robin)
  (Semifinals)
  (Semifinals)
  (Quarterfinals)
  (Quarterfinals)
  (Round robin)
  (Quarterfinals)
  RTF (Champion)
  (Quarterfinals)
  (Round robin)
  (Round robin)
  (Round robin)
  (Round robin)
  (Round robin)

Team nominations
SR = Singles ranking, DR = Doubles ranking. Rankings are as of 22 November 2021.

Format
The 18 teams were divided in six round robin groups of three teams each. The six group winners plus the two second-placed teams with the best records based on percentage of matches won (followed by percentage of sets won and then percentage of games won), qualified for the quarterfinals.

Group stage

Overview
T = Ties, M = Matches, S = Sets

Group A

Spain vs. Ecuador

RTF vs. Ecuador

Spain vs. RTF

Group B

Canada vs. Sweden

Kazakhstan vs. Sweden

Canada vs. Kazakhstan

Group C

France vs. Czech Republic

France vs. Great Britain

Great Britain vs. Czech Republic

Group D

Croatia vs. Australia

Australia vs. Hungary

Croatia vs. Hungary

Group E

United States vs. Italy

Italy vs. Colombia

United States vs. Colombia 

Note: Cabal/Farah's retirement victory over Opelka/Sock counted as a 6–0, 6–0 win.

Group F

Serbia vs. Austria

Serbia vs. Germany

Germany vs. Austria

Knockout stage

Bracket

Quarterfinals

Italy vs. Croatia

Great Britain vs. Germany

Serbia vs. Kazakhstan

RTF vs. Sweden

Semifinals

Croatia vs. Serbia

RTF vs. Germany

Final

RTF vs. Croatia

References

External links
Official website

Finals
Davis Cup Finals
Davis Cup Finals
Davis Cup Finals
Davis Cup Finals
Davis Cup Finals
Davis Cup Finals
Davis Cup Finals
Davis Cup Finals
Davis Cup Finals